Ricardo Bueno da Silva (born 15 August 1987), known as Ricardo Bueno, is a Brazilian footballer who plays as a forward for Avaí.

Career
Born in São Paulo, Ricardo started his youth career playing for América-SP, from São José do Rio Preto, São Paulo.

He was spotted by a scout that took him to Paraná, where he first played professional football for Nacional-PR, a local club from the city of Rolândia. After some good appearances, Londrina, a bigger club from Paraná, bought him in 2008. He played few games for Londrina because of a right thigh injury, which sidelined him for ten months. Still, in seven games in the 2009 Campeonato Paranaense, he scored five goals.

On 22 April 2009, Ricardo was transferred to Grêmio, a big Brazilian club from Rio Grande do Sul. He failed to make his debut for the club and was mostly on the bench.

In 2010, he was loaned to Oeste, a São Paulo state club. He made great appearances and was the top goalscorer of the 2010 Campeonato Paulista, with 16 goals in 19 matches.

After the successful campaign in the Paulistão 2010, Ricardo was transferred to Atlético Mineiro, who bought 45% of their economic rights, with the other 55% still being of Grêmio. He played many games for Atlético Mineiro in 2010, scoring a few goals, but in 2011 he failed to claim his place in the starting 11 due to injury and due to the arrival of many strikers for the season.

Palmeiras stated interest in Ricardo in August 2011, and brought him in the end of the month along with Fernandão, another striker. Ricardo was later released from Palmeiras not even a year later.

On 25 January 2013, Bueno joined the defending Danish league champions FC Nordsjælland on loan, on a contract running until the summer of 2013, after which the club can make it a permanent move. On 20 January 2014, Bueno joined Seongnam FC of K League Classic in South Korea

On 19 December 2019, it was confirmed that Bueno would join the Thai league club Buriram United for the 2020 season.

Career statistics

Honours

Club
Palmeiras
 Copa do Brasil: 2012

Figueirense
 Campeonato Catarinense: 2014

Individual
 Campeonato Paulista top scorer: 2010 (16 goals)

References

External links
 Galo Digital 
 
 

1987 births
Living people
Brazilian footballers
Association football forwards
Campeonato Brasileiro Série A players
Campeonato Brasileiro Série B players
Londrina Esporte Clube players
Grêmio Foot-Ball Porto Alegrense players
Oeste Futebol Clube players
Clube Atlético Mineiro players
Sociedade Esportiva Palmeiras players
Atlético Clube Goianiense players
Figueirense FC players
Joinville Esporte Clube players
Santa Cruz Futebol Clube players
Red Bull Brasil players
Esporte Clube São Bento players
Ceará Sporting Club players
Danish Superliga players
FC Nordsjælland players
K League 1 players
Seongnam FC players
Centro Sportivo Alagoano players
Operário Ferroviário Esporte Clube players
Esporte Clube Juventude players
Avaí FC players
Brazilian expatriate footballers
Brazilian expatriate sportspeople in Denmark
Brazilian expatriate sportspeople in South Korea
Expatriate men's footballers in Denmark
Expatriate footballers in South Korea
Footballers from São Paulo